Cazuela ( or ) is the common name given to a variety of dishes, especially from South America. It receives its name from the cazuela (Spanish for cooking pot) – traditionally, an often shallow pot made of unglazed earthenware used for cooking. The ingredients and preparation vary from region to region, but it is usually a mid-thick flavoured stock obtained from cooking several kinds of meats and vegetables mixed together.

Chilean cazuelas 

The cazuela is a typical dish of Chile. The most common types are made of chicken or beef, but there are also other types made from pork, lamb and turkey.

One of the most important facts about Chilean cazuela is that it is made by cooking all the ingredients separately and uniting them when serving in the plate. A typical dish of Chilean cazuela is made by boiling the meat (normally beef or chicken) with chopped onions and carrots. All the rest of the ingredients are boiled separately in individual pots, but the stock from the meat is complemented with the stock from the boiling of the vegetables; the plate is served accompanied of a piece of squash or zapallo camote in Spanish, one big potato or a couple of small potatoes, green beans, previously cooked rice and a piece of sweetcorn. Its normally topped with a bit of fresh coriander, parsley or ají verde.

The cazuela is typically eaten by consuming the liquid stock first, then eating the meat and larger vegetables (e.g. potatoes, large piece of squash or carrot) last. However, the meat and larger vegetables can also be sliced up within the liquid stock and can be eaten simultaneously with the liquid stock. Normally the leftovers are chopped, mixed with green peas and made into another stew called carbonada.

The Chilean cazuela  shares roots with a Mapuche stock called "korrü".

Peruvian cazuela 
Cazuela is a typical dish of the Amazonas region in Peru. The dish is prepared and cooked differently in each province or district of the Amazonas.

In Chachapoyas, the cazuela is prepared by boiling a piece of hen, a good piece of meat and a good piece of sheep. Adding some wild cabbage, rice, carrot, sweetcorn grains, and a glass of white wine.

A few minutes before taking the saucepot out of the fire, they add some milk and vermicelli noodles (also called cabello de ángel noodles). The cazuela should be made to have sufficient broth or juice to be able to be served as a soup.

Colombian cazuela 
Cazuela is a typical dish of the  Caribbean and Antioquia regions in Colombia. The dish is prepared and cooked differently in each region of Colombia.

In general the recipe for Colombian Cazuela include beans, onion, garlic, tomato, avocado, sausage, chicharron, tocino, green and yellow plantain, salt, and Olive oil or vegetable oil.

Puerto Rican cazuela 

In Puerto Rico, cazuela is a traditional crustless pie cooked in banana leaves usually made during the Christmas season. It is similar to a pumpkin pie but uses batata (a type of sweet potato), calabasa (Caribbean squash), raisins, ginger, spices, coconut milk, eggs, butter, and bread, flour or rice flour. There are recipes with added sweet plantain, ripe breadfruit, taro, or yuca with baking powder and lard.

Other regional variations 
In southern Arizona, cazuela (sometimes spelled casuela) is generally made with carne seca or machaca (two varieties of dried beef) with potatoes, garlic, green chiles, and herbs.

See also

 List of soups

References 

Chilean soups
Peruvian cuisine
Puerto Rican cuisine
Culture of Amazonas Region